
Gmina Gronowo Elbląskie is a rural gmina (administrative district) in Elbląg County, Warmian-Masurian Voivodeship, in northern Poland.

Villages
Gmina Gronowo Elbląskie contains the villages and settlements of Błotnica, Czarna Grobla, Dworki, Fiszewo, Gajewiec, Gronowo Elbląskie, Jasionno, Jegłownik, Karczowiska Górne, Kopanka Druga, Kopanka Pierwsza, Mechnica, Mojkowo, Nogat, Nowy Dwór Elbląski, Oleśno, Różany, Rozgart, Sporowo, Szopy, Wikrowo and Wiktorowo.

Neighbouring gminas
Gmina Gronowo Elbląskie is bordered by the gminas of Elbląg, Markusy, Nowy Dwór Gdański and Stare Pole.

References
Polish official population figures 2006

Gronowo Elblaskie
Elbląg County